Ceylon participated in the 1954 Asian Games held in the capital city of Manila, Philippines. This country was ranked 10th with a silver medal and a bronze medal with a total of 2 medals to secure its spot in the medal tally.

Medalists

Medal summary

Medal table

References

Nations at the 1954 Asian Games
Sri Lanka at the Asian Games
1954 in Ceylon
This article related to sport in Ceylon is a stub. You can help Wikipedia by expanding it.